Mishref District is one of the districts of Hawalli Governorate in Kuwait.

Districts of Hawalli Governorate